The ice hockey competitions at the 2017 Southeast Asian Games in Kuala Lumpur was held at the Empire City Ice Arena in Selangor.

The 2017 games featured only men's tournament.

Competition schedule
The following was the competition schedule for the ice hockey competitions:

Participation

Participating nations

Competition format
The tournament will follow a single round robin format with the top team by the end of the tournament winning the gold medal.

Squads

Legend
G– Goalie D = Defense F = Forward

Results
All times are Malaysia Standard Time (UTC+8)

Round robin

Statistics

Scoring leaders

Source: IIHF.com

Goaltending leaders
Only the top five goaltenders, based on save percentage, who have played at least 40% of their team's minutes, are included in this list.

Source: IIHF.com

Final standings

Notes

References

External links
 
 Fixtures and Results at International Ice Hockey Federation

2017
2017 Southeast Asian Games events
Southeast Asian Games
Southeast Asian Games
International ice hockey competitions hosted by Malaysia